This is a list of Northern Arizona Lumberjacks football players in the NFL Draft.

Key

Selections

References

Northern Arizona

Northern Arizona Lumberjacks NFL Draft